National Route 201 is a national highway of Japan connecting Higashi-ku, Fukuoka and Kanda, Fukuoka in Japan, with a total length of 64.5 km (40.08 mi).

References

National highways in Japan
Roads in Fukuoka Prefecture